The Westweg ("West Way" or "West Trail") is a long-distance hiking trail in Germany, running north–south through the Black Forest from Pforzheim to Basel.  The trail is around 285 km long, and was founded in 1900.  It is currently maintained under the auspices of the Black Forest Club.  The trail symbol is a red lozenge on a white background.
The Westweg is a part of the European Long-distance Trail E1 (North Cape, Norway - Sicily)
The route passes through or near numerous villages or small towns, so there is no difficulty in finding overnight accommodation and meals along the route.  It would actually require more planning to walk it while staying in youth hostel-type accommodation, or camping.  There are a number of services that will transport your luggage to the next accommodation by vehicle, leaving the hikers with only their daypacks for the hike.  The route can be accessed at several places along its length by road or public transport, so it is easy to walk part of it or to do day walks along its route.

Route Description 

The Westweg begins in Pforzheim, then leads through the Enz valley to the Dobel, then through wide forests and moors to the Hohloh.  After descending into the Murg valley, the trail climbs to the highest point in the northern Black Forest, the Hornisgrinde. The next section follows the Schwarzwaldhochstraße (Black Forest High Street) to Alexanderschanze, and then through the Kinzig valley to Hausach. After a steep climb the Westweg leads from the Martinskapelle (the source of the Breg) to Kalten Herberge, the European continental divide between the Rhine and Danube rivers.  At the Feldberg saddle the Westweg forks into an eastern and a western section. The western route (Variation A) runs over the Feldberg, Belchen, and Blauen to Kandern, then through the Wolfschlucht to the Wiese valley, and on to Basel.  The eastern section (Variation B) branches southward to the second highest mountain in the Black Forest, the Herzogenhorn, over the pass between the Wehra and Wiese valleys, toward the Hohe Möhr, by Weil am Rhein and down the Rhine valley to Basel.

History 
The current Westweg was created in 1900 by the Baden Section of the Schwarzwaldverein (Black Forest Society). Proposals for the creation of a north–south hiking trail along the crest of the Black Forest go back to 1894.

The Westweg, which was complemented by the Ostweg (East Trail) from Pforzheim to Schaffhausen and the Mittelweg (Middle Trail) from Pforzheim to Waldshut in 1903, has become the model for many other long-distance hiking trails.

On December 15, 2006 the Westweg was awarded the certification of "Qualitätsweg Wanderbares Deutschland". (Quality Trail of Hikable Germany). In order to meet a criterion for this certification, that no more than 20% of the trail could be paved, several stretches of the trail had to be relocated or rebuilt in a more natural setting.

Dayhikes/Stages

Stages Shared by Variations A and B

First Stage: Pforzheim–Dobel

Main Variant 
24 km, c. 6 hours walking time

Higher Variant 

In 2006 the first stage of the Westweg was relocated.  The former stage is now marked as the "High Variation"

Second Stage: Dobel–Forbach 
25 km, c. 6.5 hours walking time

Third Stage: Forbach–Unterstmatt 
19 km, c. 5.5 hours walking time

Fourth Stage: Unterstmatt–Alexanderschanze 
27.5 km, c. 7 hours walking time

Fifth Stage: Alexanderschanze–Auf der Hark 
18 km, c. 4.5 hours walking time

This stage and the next can be completed in one day by experienced hikers.

Sixth Stage: Auf der Hark–Hausach 
16.5 km, c. 4 hours walking time

This stage and the previous one can be completed in one day by experienced hikers.

Seventh Stage: Hausach–Wilhelmshöhe (above Schonach) 
21.5 km, c. 5.5 hours walking time

Eighth Stage: Wilhelmshöhe–Kalte Herberge 
23.5 km, c. 6 hours walking time

After the ninth stage these descriptions follow the pre-2006 route. Since then the fork between the eastern and western variations has moved to Titisee. The western branch leads from there over the ridge between Titisee and Hinterzarten toward Oberzarten. From there it follows the Emil Thomas Path to the peak of the Feldberg, where it rejoins its former route. After Kandern the trail now goes through the Wolfschlucht to Wollbach. The eastern variation follows its former path through the Bärental, the Zweiseenblick, the Cartitasheim, and then on toward Herzogenhorn

Ninth Stage: Kalte Herberge–Bärental (Pre-2006)
26.5 km, c. 6.5 hours walking time

Variation A - Western Route

Tenth Stage: Bärental–Wiedener Eck (pre-2006) 
24.5 km, c. 6 hours walking time

Eleventh Stage: Wiedener Eck–Blauen (pre-2006) 
21 km, c. 5.5 hours walking time

Twelfth Stage: Blauen–Basel (pre-2006) 
32.5 km, c. 8 hours walking time

Variation B – Eastern Route

Tenth Stage: Bärental–Hochkopfhaus (pre-2006) 
26.5 km, c. 7 hours walking time

Eleventh Stage: Hochkopfhaus–Schweigmatt (pre-2006) 
18.5 km, c. 5 hours walking time

Twelfth Stage: Schweigmatt–Adelhausen (pre-2006) 
18 km, c. 4.5 hours walking time

Thirteenth Stage: Adelhausen–Basel (pre-2006) 
18 km, c. 4.5 hours walking time

Notes

External links 

 Exact Trail Guide
 Detailed Trail Guide
 Description by the Schwarzwaldverein
 Elevation profile und overview map at www.wanderbares-deutschland.de
 Information about the Schwarzwaldverein's hundredth anniversary
 Westweg - Trail description, elevation profile and GPS tracks
 Wanderservice Schwarzwald – Web application of the Schwarzwaldverein: the Westweg in GoogleMaps with various overlays (Trail network, signposts, accommodations, ...)

Hiking trails in Baden-Württemberg
Transport in the Black Forest